The Astropectinidae are a family of sea stars in the order Paxillosida. Usually, these starfish live on the seabed and immerse themselves in soft sediment such as sand and mud.

They are not to be confused with species in the genus Archaster, which share similar shape and life habits, but belong to the family Archasteridae (order Valvatida).

Genera
There are 27 genera in the family:
 Astromesites Fisher, 1913
 Astropecten Gray, 1840
 Astropectinides Verrill, 1914
 Bathybiaster Danielssen & Koren, 1883
 Blakiaster Perrier, 1881
 Bollonaster McKnight, 1977
 Bunodaster Verrill, 1909
 Craspidaster Sladen, 1889
 Ctenophoraster Fisher, 1906
 Ctenopleura Fisher, 1913
 Dipsacaster Alcock, 1893
 Dytaster Sladen, 1889
 Koremaster Fisher, 1913
 Leptychaster E.A. Smith, 1876
 Lonchotaster Sladen, 1889
 Macroptychaster H.E.S. Clark, 1963
 Mimastrella Fisher, 1916
 Patagiaster Fisher, 1906
 Persephonaster Wood-Mason & Alcock, 1891
 Pentasteria Valette, 1929
 Plutonaster Sladen, 1889
 Proserpinaster Fell, 1963
 Psilaster Sladen, 1885
 Tethyaster Sladen, 1889
 Thrissacanthias Fisher, 1910
 Tritonaster Fisher, 1906
 Trophodiscus Fisher, 1917

References
 

 
Paxillosida
Echinoderm families